Daniel Philip "Dapper Dan" Howley (October 16, 1885 – March 10, 1944) was a Major League Baseball manager with the St. Louis Browns and the Cincinnati Reds. His first year as manager of the Browns saw his team lose 94 games and finish  games behind the legendary 1927 New York Yankees. In 1929, he was hired by the Reds, but he averaged 95 losses in three years, leading to his dismissal. He finished his career with a lifetime 397–524 record (.431 winning percentage).

He was a four-time manager of the Toronto Maple Leafs of the International League, leading the team in 1918, 1923–1926, 1933, and 1937, winning the league pennant in 1918 and 1926. Howley was inducted into the International League Hall of Fame.

Prior to his managing career, Howley was a major league catcher for part of the  season for the Philadelphia Phillies.  He later served as a coach for the Detroit Tigers for three seasons, 1919 and 1921–22. Howley also acted as the first base umpire in a July 1922 game.

Howley died of a heart attack in his birthplace of Weymouth, Massachusetts at age 58.

Managerial record

References

External links
 
 

1885 births
1944 deaths
Major League Baseball catchers
Philadelphia Phillies players
St. Louis Browns managers
Cincinnati Reds managers
Baseball players from Massachusetts
Montreal Royals managers
Toronto Maple Leafs (International League) managers
Sportspeople from Weymouth, Massachusetts
Detroit Tigers coaches
Boston Red Sox scouts
Grand Rapids Wolverines players
Indianapolis Indians players
Portland Beavers players
Montreal Royals players
Toronto Maple Leafs (International League) players
Hartford Senators players
New Bedford Whalers (baseball) players